The Provinciale Zeeuwse Courant is a newspaper for the province of Zeeland, Netherlands published and owned by DPG Media of Belgium. Founded in 1758, it is the third-oldest newspaper of the Netherlands.

History

19th century: Middelburgsche Courant
The paper is a merger of a number of regional papers, the oldest of which was the Middelburgsche Courant, founded in 1758 in Middelburg. One of its scoops was hiring the first female reporter in the Netherlands, in 1885.

20th century: Forming the Provinciale Zeeuwsche Courant
In 1933, the Middelburgsche Courant acquired a paper from Goes, the Goesche Courant. In 1939, it merged with the Vlissingsche Courant, founded 1869 in Vlissingen, and became the Provinciale Zeeuwsche Courant.

In 1946 another Goes newspaper, Vrije Stemmen: Dagblad voor Zeeland, merged  into PZC. Vrije Stemmen started as an underground newspaper during WWII. In 1998 PZC acquired the Zierikzeesche Nieuwsbode, founded in 1844 by Pieter de Looze of Zierikzee.

21st century: Decreasing readership
In 2006 PZCs circulation was 58,000, down 3% from the year before, following a trend among Dutch regional newspapers. In 2007 and 2008 hovered around 52,000. Visitors to the paper's website brought the total readership up to 250,000 in 2008.

In 2008 PZC celebrated its 250th anniversary in the presence of Beatrix of the Netherlands, who received a copy of the commemorative book PZC 250 Jaar.

In 2010 Wegener was fined 20 million Euros by the Dutch competition regulator, the Nederlandse Mededingingsautoriteit. Wegener also owned BN/De Stem, a regional newspaper in west North Brabant that published a Zeeland edition. BN/De Stem had been acquired by Wegener in 2000 when it took over VNU, and it had been required to keep both papers editorially separate to continue to offer readers a choice between two independent newspapers. In 2009 complaints had come in that Wegener had combined operations as a cost-cutting measure, leading to the 2010 verdict.

In 2010, 48% of the paper's paid subscribers share the paper with their neighbors, the highest such number among Dutch newspapers. In 2012 circulation was down to 49,948 copies. In 2015 Wegener was sold to the De Persgroep of Belgium, now known as DPG Media.

References

Dutch-language newspapers
Daily newspapers published in the Netherlands
Mass media in Zeeland
Vlissingen